Petr Pavlík may refer to:

 Petr Pavlík (footballer, born 1987), Czech footballer
 Petr Pavlík (footballer, born 1978), Czech footballer